2008 Finnish Cup  was the 54th season of the main annual football competition in Finland. It was organized as a single-elimination knock–out tournament.

Participation in the competition is voluntary. Veikkausliiga side IFK Mariehamn, for example, decided not to register for the tournament, as well as some Ykkönen teams.

Depending on their position within the league system, teams entered in different rounds. Clubs with teams in Kolmonen or an inferior league, as well as Veterans and Junior teams, started the competition in the First Round. Teams from the first three levels of the Finnish league pyramid entered in the Fourth Round, with the exception of Veikkausliiga clubs Tampere United, FC Haka, FC Honka and TPS. These four teams entered in the Sixth Round because they have qualified for European competitions after the 2007 season.

The tournament started on 1 April 2008 with the First Round and concluded with the Final held on 1 November 2008 at Finnair Stadium, Helsinki.

Participating teams

First round
The draw for this round was conducted on 11 March 2008. Exactly one hundred teams were drawn into fifty matches for this round, with the remaining teams receiving a bye. Matches were played on April 1 – 10, 2008.

Second round
The draw for this round was conducted on 11 March 2008. The winners of the First Round, along with the teams who received a bye, were drawn into 130 matches for this round. Matches were played between April 2 – 25, 2008.

Third round
The draw for this round was conducted on 11 April 2008. The winners of the previous round participated in this round. Matches were played on April 19 – May 6, 2008.

Fourth round
The draw for this round was conducted on 23 April 2008. The 65 winners of the Third Round, along with the 47 teams from the top three tiers which entered in this round, were drawn into 56 matches for this round. Matches were played on May 6 – 30, 2008.

Fifth round
The draw for this round was conducted on 20 May 2008. The winners of the Fourth Round participated in this round. Matches were played between June 1 – 11, 2008.

Sixth Round
The draw for this round was conducted on 12 June 2008. The 28 winners of the Fifth Round, along with the last four Veikkausliiga teams which entered in this round, were drawn into 16 matches for this round. Matches were played on June 17 and 19, 2008.

Seventh Round
The draw for this round was conducted on 22 June 2008. The winners of Sixth Round participated in this round. The first six matches were played on 2 July while the other two games took place on 9 July 2008.

Quarter-finals
The draw for this round was conducted on 14 July 2008. The first three matches were played on 7 August 2008. The match between Honka and Tampere United has been postponed to a later date because of the Tampere's participation in the UEFA Champions League 2008–09 qualification rounds.

Semi-finals

Final

References

External links
 Official page 
 suomencup.net 

Finnish Cup seasons
Finnish Cup, 2008
Finnish Cup, 2008